Kusel is a former Verbandsgemeinde ("collective municipality") in the district of Kusel, Rhineland-Palatinate, Germany. In January 2018 it was merged into the new Verbandsgemeinde Kusel-Altenglan. The seat of the Verbandsgemeinde was in Kusel.

The Verbandsgemeinde Kusel consisted of the following Ortsgemeinden ("local municipalities"):

Former Verbandsgemeinden in Rhineland-Palatinate